The Bilyaminu Othman College of Education is a state government higher education institution located in Dass, Bauchi State, Nigeria.

History 
The Bilyaminu Othman College of Education was established in 2013.

Courses 
The institution offers the following courses;

 Integrated Science Education
 Education and History
 Business Education
 Computer Education
 Education and Economics
 Special Education
 Education and Biology
 Education and English
 Social Studies
 Education and Geography
 Arabic Medium

See also 
Academic libraries in Nigeria

References 

Universities and colleges in Nigeria
2013 establishments in Nigeria
 Academic libraries in Nigeria
Educational institutions established in 2013